Ficus capillipes is an Asian species of fig tree in the family Moraceae.   No subspecies are listed in the Catalogue of Life; the native range of this species is Indo-China and Sumatra.  The species can be found in Vietnam: where it may be called ''đa cuống mãnh.

References

External links 

capillipes
Trees of Vietnam
Flora of Indo-China
Flora of Malesia